Platynerita is a genus of submarine cave snails, marine gastropod mollusks in the family Neritiliidae.

Species
Species within the genus Platynerita include:

 Platynerita rufa Kano & Kase, 2003

References

Neritiliidae
Monotypic gastropod genera